Diane Colleen Lane (born January 22, 1965) is an American actress. Born and raised in New York City, Lane made her screen debut at age 14 in George Roy Hill's 1979 film A Little Romance.

The two films that could have catapulted her to star status, Streets of Fire and The Cotton Club, were both commercial and critical failures, and her career languished as a result. After taking a break, Lane returned to acting to appear in The Big Town and Lady Beware, but did not make another big impression on a sizable audience until 1989's popular and critically acclaimed TV miniseries Lonesome Dove, for which she was nominated for an Emmy Award. It was not until 1999 that Lane earned further recognition for her role in A Walk on the Moon, and that was followed by her performance alongside George Clooney and Mark Wahlberg in the 2000 blockbuster The Perfect Storm.

She was especially lauded and honored for the 2002 film Unfaithful, which earned her Satellite, New York Film Critics Circle, and National Society of Film Critics awards for Best Actress in a Motion Picture (Drama). Her performance in Unfaithful also garnered her Academy Award, Golden Globe, and Screen Actors Guild Award nominations for Best Actress. She was also highly acclaimed by critics for her performance in the immediately subsequent film Under the Tuscan Sun.  For much of the rest of the decade, she alternately appeared as a lead actress in romantic films such as Must Love Dogs (2005) and Nights in Rodanthe (2008), and thrillers such as Fierce People (2005), Hollywoodland (2006), and Untraceable (2008).

She has appeared in four films directed by Francis Ford Coppola: The Outsiders, Rumble Fish, The Cotton Club, and Jack. She has been in one film directed by his wife Eleanor Coppola: Paris Can Wait.

She also played the recurring role of Martha Kent, the adoptive mother of Superman, in Man of Steel (2013) and appeared in subsequent films of the DC Extended Universe.  Her most recent film is the 2020 neo-western Let Him Go.

Early life
Lane was born January 22, 1965, in New York City. Her mother, Colleen Leigh Farrington, was a nightclub singer and Playboy centerfold (Miss October 1957), who was also known as "Colleen Price". Her father, Burton Eugene Lane, was a Manhattan drama coach who ran an acting workshop with John Cassavetes, worked as a cab driver, and later taught humanities  at City College. When Lane was 13 days old, her parents separated. Lane's mother went to Mexico and obtained a divorce while retaining custody of Lane until she was six years old. Lane's father received custody of her after Lane's mother moved to the state of Georgia. Lane and her father lived in a number of residential hotels in New York City and she rode with him in his taxi.

When Lane was 15, she declared her independence from her father and flew to Los Angeles for a week with actor and friend Christopher Atkins with whom she starred in the 1981 film Child Bride of Short Creek. Lane later remarked, "It was reckless behavior that comes from having too much independence too young." She returned to New York and moved in with a friend's family, paying them rent. In 1981, she enrolled in high school after taking correspondence courses. However, Lane's mother kidnapped her and took her back to Georgia. Lane and her father challenged her mother in court, and six weeks later, she was back in New York. Lane did not speak to her mother for the next three years, but they eventually reconciled.

Career

Early work: From A Little Romance to A Walk on the Moon
Lane's grandmother, Eleanor Scott, was a Pentecostal preacher of the Apostolic denomination, and Lane was influenced theatrically by the demonstrative quality of her grandmother's sermons. Lane began acting professionally at the age of six at the La MaMa Experimental Theatre Club in New York, where she appeared in a production of Medea. When Lane was 12 years old, she had a role in Joseph Papp's production of The Cherry Orchard with Meryl Streep and Irene Worth. At this time, Lane was enrolled in an accelerated program at Hunter College High School; however, her grades suffered from her busy schedule. When Lane was 13, she turned down a role in Runaways on Broadway to make her feature-film debut opposite Laurence Olivier in A Little Romance. Lane won high praise from Olivier, who declared her "The New Grace Kelly". At the same time, Lane was featured on the cover of Time, which declared her one of Hollywood's "Whiz Kids".

In the early 1980s, Lane made a successful transition from inexperienced actress to confirmed roles. She was cast as the young female outlaw Little Britches in the 1981 Lamont Johnson film, Cattle Annie and Little Britches, with Amanda Plummer in her own debut role as Cattle Annie. She played the role of Heather (Breezy) in Six Pack (1982) with Kenny Rogers. Lane starred as Corinne Burns, leader of a punk rock band in 1982's Ladies and Gentlemen, The Fabulous Stains, with Laura Dern and punk musicians Steve Jones and Paul Cook of the Sex Pistols, and Paul Simonon from the Clash.  The film has become a cult classic.

Lane's breakout performances came with back-to-back adaptations of novels by S. E. Hinton, adapted and directed by Francis Ford Coppola: The Outsiders and Rumble Fish, both in 1983. Both films also featured memorable performances from a number of young male actors who would go on to become leading men in the next decade (as well as members of the so-called "Brat Pack"), including Tom Cruise, Rob Lowe, Judd Nelson, C. Thomas Howell, Emilio Estevez, Patrick Swayze, Mickey Rourke, Nicolas Cage, and Matt Dillon. Lane's distinction among these heavily male casts advanced her career while affiliating her with young male actors. Andy Warhol proclaimed her, "the undisputed female lead of Hollywood's new rat pack".

However, the two films that could have catapulted her to star status, Streets of Fire (she turned down Splash and Risky Business for this film) and The Cotton Club, were both commercial and critical failures, and her career languished as a result. After The Cotton Club, Lane dropped out of the movie business and lived with her mother in Georgia. According to the actress, "I hadn't been close to my mom for a long time, so we had a lot of homework to do. We had to repair our relationship because I wanted my mother back."

Lane returned to acting to appear in The Big Town and Lady Beware, but Lane had not made another big impression on a sizable audience until 1989's popular and critically acclaimed TV miniseries Lonesome Dove, and was nominated for an Emmy Award for her role. She came very close to being cast as Vivian Ward in 1990's blockbuster hit Pretty Woman (which had a much darker script at the time), but due to scheduling conflicts, was unable to take the role. Apparently, costume fittings were made for Lane, before the role fell to Julia Roberts. She was given positive reviews for her performance in the independent film My New Gun, which was well received at the Cannes Film Festival. She went on to appear as actress Paulette Goddard in Sir Richard Attenborough's big-budget biopic of Charles Chaplin, 1992's Chaplin. Over the next seven years Lane would star in ten movies, including Jack and Judge Dredd. It wasn't until 1999 that Lane earned further recognition for her role in A Walk on the Moon. The film also stars Liev Schreiber, Viggo Mortensen, and Anna Paquin. One reviewer wrote, "Lane, after years in post-young-career limbo, is meltingly effective." The film's director, Tony Goldwyn, described Lane as having "this potentially volcanic sexuality that is in no way self-conscious or opportunistic." Lane earned an Independent Spirit Award nomination for Best Female Lead. At this time, she was interested in making a film about actress Jean Seberg in which she would play Seberg.

Recent work: From Unfaithful to the present
In 2000, Lane had a supporting role as Mark Wahlberg's love interest in The Perfect Storm. In 2002, she starred in Unfaithful, a drama directed by Adrian Lyne and adapted from the French film The Unfaithful Wife. Lane played a housewife who indulges in an affair with a mysterious book dealer. The film featured several sex scenes, and Lane's repeated takes for these scenes were very demanding for the actors involved, especially for Lane, who had to be emotionally and physically fit for the duration. Unfaithful received mostly mixed reviews, though Lane earned widespread praise for her performance. Besides winning the Best Actress National Society of Film Critics Award and the New York Film Critics Circle Award, she also received Best Actress Academy Award and Golden Globe nominations. Entertainment Weekly critic Owen Gleiberman stated that "Lane, in the most urgent performance of her career, is a revelation. The play of lust, romance, degradation, and guilt on her face is the movie's real story." Following Unfaithful, Lane starred in Under the Tuscan Sun, a film based on the best-selling book by Frances Mayes for which Lane won a further Best Actress Golden Globe nomination. This was followed by lead roles in Fierce People, Must Love Dogs, and Hollywoodland.

In 2008, Lane reunited with Richard Gere for the romantic drama Nights in Rodanthe. It is the third film Gere and Lane filmed together, and is based on the novel of the same title by Nicholas Sparks. Lane also co-starred in Jumper and Untraceable in the same year. She then appeared in Killshot with Mickey Rourke, which was given a limited theatrical release before being released on DVD in 2009. While promoting Nights in Rodanthe, she expressed frustration with being typecast and stated that she was "gunning for something that's not so sympathetic. I need to be a bitch, and I need to be in a comedy. I've decided. No more Miss Nice Guy." Lane had even contemplated quitting acting and spending more time with her family if she is unable to get these kinds of roles. She said in an interview, "I can't do anything official. My agents won't let me. Between you and me, I don't have anything else coming out." Despite her concerns with being typecast, Lane signed on to Secretariat (2010), a Disney film about the relationship between the 1973 Triple Crown-winning racehorse and his owner, Penny Chenery, whom Lane portrayed.

Lane then starred in Cinema Verite (2011), an HBO movie about the making of the first reality television show An American Family. Lane earned Emmy, Screen Actors Guild, Satellite, and Golden Globe award nominations for her portrayal of Pat Loud. In 2012, Lane was featured in the PBS documentary Half the Sky: Turning Oppression into Opportunity for Women Worldwide (produced by Show of Force along with Fugitive Films), which showcased women and girls living under very difficult circumstances and bravely fighting to challenge them.

Following the success of Cinema Verite, Lane starred in Zack Snyder's Superman film Man of Steel, playing Martha Kent. Snyder said of her casting, "We are thrilled to have Diane in the role because she can convey the wisdom and the wonder of a woman whose son has powers beyond her imagination." Lane reprised her role as Martha Kent in Batman v Superman: Dawn of Justice (2016) and Justice League (2017).

Shortly after the release of Man of Steel, Lane was tapped to play Hillary Clinton in an NBC miniseries, Hillary, which was supposed to "start with the Monica Lewinsky morning-after ... And then continue on until she was embarking on her [2008] presidential bid." Intense media backlash ultimately caused NBC to cancel the series. In 2015, Lane appeared in the drama Every Secret Thing (alongside Dakota Fanning and Elizabeth Banks), had a voice role in the Pixar animated feature Inside Out, and co-starred in the biopic Trumbo (opposite Bryan Cranston and Helen Mirren), which received a Screen Actors Guild nomination for Best Ensemble Cast. Besides Justice League, Lane appeared in two other films in 2017: Eleanor Coppola's Paris Can Wait and Mark Felt: The Man Who Brought Down the White House.

In the end of 2012, and before her divorce from Josh Brolin in early 2013, Lane returned to her theater roots and headlined a production of the David Cromer directed Sweet Bird of Youth (by Tennessee Williams) at the Goodman Theatre in Chicago. Lane played Princess Kosmonopolis, a fading Hollywood movie star, opposite Finn Wittrock, who portrayed Chance, her attractive gigolo. This was the first time she had done a stage play since 1989, when she played Olivia in William Shakespeare's Twelfth Night at the American Repertory Theater in Cambridge, Massachusetts. Lane returned to theatre in the winter of 2015, starring with Tony Shalhoub in the off-Broadway original production of Bathsheba Doran's The Mystery of Love and Sex. In 2016, nearly four decades after she first appeared on Broadway, Lane starred in a play in which she previously performed: Chekhov's The Cherry Orchard (1977). While Lane played a child peasant (with no lines) in Broadway's 1977 run of the play, this time she played the lead role of Madame Lyubov Andreyevna Ranevskaya.

In 2018, Lane starred in the Amazon original miniseries The Romanoffs, which premiered in October, and as Annette Shepherd in the final season of Netflix's hit series House of Cards, which was released on the streaming service on November 2. These roles "seemingly "mark[ed] rare TV appearance[s] for Lane, who has primarily worked in film throughout her career."

In 2019, she played one of Matthew McConaughey's character's love interests in the thriller Serenity. She will also star in an untitled Reed Morano-directed film with Jeff Bridges (whom she previously worked with in Wild Bill), in addition to starring in the series on FX based on the post-apocalyptic science fiction comic book series Y: The Last Man. Lane also co-starred with Kevin Costner in the 2020 thriller Let Him Go.

Personal life

Family

Lane met actor Christopher Lambert in Paris while promoting The Cotton Club in 1984. They had a brief affair and split up. They met again two years later in Rome to make a film together, entitled Priceless Beauty, and in two weeks they were a couple again. Lane and Lambert married in October 1988 in Santa Fe, New Mexico. They have a daughter, Eleanor Jasmine Lambert. They divorced in March 1994.

Lane became engaged to actor Josh Brolin in July 2003 and they were married on August 15, 2004. On December 20 of that year, she called police after an altercation with him, and he was arrested on a misdemeanor charge of domestic battery. Lane declined to press charges, however, and the couple's spokesperson described the incident as a "misunderstanding". Lane and Brolin filed for divorce in February 2013. Their divorce was finalized on December 2, 2013.

Charity work
Lane is also involved in several charities, including Heifer International, which focuses on world hunger, Artists for Peace and Justice, a Hollywood organization that supports Haiti relief, and the BrandAID Project.

However, she tries not to draw attention to her humanitarian efforts: "Sometimes I give with my heart. Sometimes I give financially, but there's something about [helping others] that I think ought to be anonymous. I don't want it to be a boastful thing."

Lane was featured heavily in the documentary Half the Sky, based on the book Half the Sky: Turning Oppression into Opportunity for Women Worldwide. The documentary had Lane and several other A-list actresses/celebrities visit Africa and other areas where women are oppressed. Lane has become an ambassador for this kind of work and charity work in general.

On August 22, 2014, Lane was honored for her work with Heifer International at its third annual Beyond Hunger: A Place at the Table gala at the Montage Beverly Hills. Lane says working with Heifer International has affected her life and nurtured the relationship she has with her daughter.

Theater 
At age 6, Lane landed her first acting role in La Mama Experimental Theatre Company's 1971 production of Medea in which she played Medea's daughter. From then until 1976, she performed with La MaMa, E.T.C. in New York and toured with them abroad. Some of the plays she performed in include The Trojan Women, Electra, Bertolt Brecht's The Good Woman of Szechuan, Federico García Lorca's Blood Wedding, Paul Foster's The Silver Queen, and Shakespeare's As You Like It. Most of these plays were directed and/or adapted by Andrei Șerban and Elizabeth Swados.

From 1976 to 1977, Lane appeared in The Cherry Orchard and Agamemnon at New York's Vivian Beaumont Theater. After participating in the first production of Runaways when it was off-Broadway, Lane took a decade-long hiatus from theatre. In 1989, Lane returned to the stage to play Olivia in Twelfth Night at the American Repertory Theater in Cambridge, Massachusetts. Lane took another hiatus from theatre until 2012, when she starred opposite Finn Wittrock in Sweet Bird of Youth at the Goodman Theatre in Chicago (directed by David Cromer). Lane then returned to New York theatre and starred off-Broadway in Bathsheba Doran's The Mystery of Love and Sex in 2015 (alongside Tony Shalhoub) and in Broadway's revival of Chekhov's The Cherry Orchard in 2016 (alongside Joel Grey and Harold Perrineau).

Awards and nominations
Four days before the New York Film Critics Circle's vote in 2002, Lane was given a career tribute by the Film Society of Lincoln Center. A day before that, Lyne held a dinner for the actress at the Four Seasons Hotel. Critics and award voters were invited to both. She went on to win the National Society of Film Critics, the New York Film Critics Circle awards and was nominated for a Golden Globe and an Academy Award for Best Actress. In 2003, she was named ShoWest's 2003 Female Star of the Year, and was a co-recipient of the Women in Film Crystal Award honoring outstanding women in entertainment.

Lane ranked at No. 79 on VH1's 100 Greatest Kid Stars. She was ranked No. 45 on AskMen.com's Top 99 Most Desirable Women in 2005, No. 85 in 2006 and No. 98 in 2007.

Honors 

 2003: Honored as the Female Star of the Year by the ShoWest Convention.
 2004: Received the American Riviera Award during the Santa Barbara International Film Festival.
 2012: Received the Outstanding Achievement in Cinema Award during the Savannah Film Festival.
 2017: Received the Career Achievement Award during the Sarasota Film Festival.

Accolades

References

Further reading

External links

Diane Lane at Film Reference

1965 births
Living people
20th-century American actresses
21st-century American actresses
Actresses from New York City
American child actresses
Female models from New York (state)
American film actresses
American television actresses
American stage actresses
American voice actresses
Hunter College High School alumni
People from Manhattan